Esther Taiwo Olukoya and Emily Kehinde Olukoga-Ogunde (born 1913, Ijebu-Ode) are identical twin sisters from Nigeria. They celebrated their 100th birthday on March 16, 2013, as Nigeria's oldest twins. At the time, unlike her twin sister, Esther used a wheelchair. They were both traders by profession. Emily was also one of the wives of the veteran actor Hubert Ogunde. They attributed their longevity in part to heredity (their mother died at age 104) and in part to their choice for a healthier lifestyle (neither of them smoked nor drank) and their faith in God. Emily died in September 2013. She was survived by her twin sister, a son, many grand children and great grand children, among other relatives. Esther died in 2018.

References

Nigerian twins
Nigerian centenarians
Identical twins
1913 births
2013 deaths
2018 deaths
People from Ijebu Ode
20th-century Nigerian women
21st-century Nigerian women
Emily
Nigerian Christians
Yoruba women
Women centenarians